Oakdale Airport  is a public airport located  southeast of the central business district (CBD) of Oakdale, a city in Stanislaus County, California, USA. It is mostly used for general aviation.

References

External links 

Airports in Stanislaus County, California